The megrim, megrim sole, whiff, Salcombe sole or Cornish sole (Lepidorhombus whiffiagonis) is a species of left-eyed flatfish in the family Scophthalmidae. It is caught commercially by some countries.

Description
It is left-eyed, has a slightly larger head than usual in flatfish, and with a narrower body than usual. The dorsal and ventral fins are relatively short and start far back on the body. The colouration is usually light brown with dark spots across the body and dark grey fins. It lacks the highly distinct dark spots found on the fins in its close relative, the four-spot megrim (L. boscii).

Habitat
The megrim is usually found over a sandy or muddy sea floor. They are predators and eat small fish and squid and also consume crustaceans. In turn megrim are themselves prey for larger species such as sharks, seals and large cod. Megrim spawn in deep waters off Iceland and the west of Ireland, while there is a separate spawning population in the Mediterranean.

Range
This species is found throughout European waters and the Northeast Atlantic including the Sea of the Hebrides. Megrim are also found off the north coast of Africa and in parts of the Mediterranean.

Commercial value
Megrim are commercially valuable and are caught by a number of nations around Europe. It is caught by bottom trawling and is directly targeted in some fisheries, whereas in others it is retained as a valuable bycatch. France and Spain are the largest consumers of this species with most of the megrim caught in British water being exported to these nations. However, there has been a drive in Britain to get people to eat more megrim as a way of taking pressure off overexploited fish such as cod and haddock.
Megrim can be cooked in a number of different ways with grilling, baking, frying and poaching all effective ways of preparing this species. It has been described as being similar to sole or plaice in terms of preparation, but not being comparable in terms of flavour or texture. In the UK, megrim has been given the alternative name of Cornish sole as a way of making this species, most of the UK catch of which was formerly exported to the European Union, more appealing to UK consumers after Brexit.

References

Further reading
 

Scophthalmidae
Fish of the Atlantic Ocean
Fish of Europe
Fish described in 1792
Taxa named by Johann Julius Walbaum